Peter Christian Cain (born 20 November 1958) is an Australian pair skater who currently works as a coach. With sister Elizabeth Cain, he is the 1976 World Junior bronze medalist and a four-time Australian national champion. Their highest placement at the World Championships was 12th in 1977. They competed in the 1980 Winter Olympics, finishing eleventh. He is the uncle and former coach of Australian national champion Sean Carlow and father of American skater Ashley Cain. His former students include Alexei Krasnozhon and Brooklee Han. He currently works as a coach in the Euless, Texas area.

He is an ISU Technical Specialist for Australia.

Results
(with Cain)

References

 Sports-reference profile
 Skatabase: 1980s Olympics
 Skatabase: 1970s Worlds

Australian male pair skaters
Figure skaters at the 1980 Winter Olympics
Olympic figure skaters of Australia
Australian figure skating coaches
International Skating Union technical specialists
1958 births
Living people
World Junior Figure Skating Championships medalists